Miha Kline (born 26 March 1980) is a Slovenian former football midfielder.

He has previously played for Shinnik Yaroslavl in the Russian Premier League, Dinaburg in the Latvian League and Domžale in the Slovenian PrvaLiga.

References

1980 births
Living people
Footballers from Ljubljana
Slovenian footballers
Association football midfielders
NK Ljubljana players
NK Domžale players
NK Dravograd players
Slovenian expatriate footballers
Expatriate footballers in Latvia
Dinaburg FC players
Slovenian expatriate sportspeople in Russia
Expatriate footballers in Russia
FC Shinnik Yaroslavl players
Slovenian PrvaLiga players
Russian Premier League players
Veria F.C. players
NK Svoboda Ljubljana players